Arthur Dillon, Count Dillon (1670–1733) was a Jacobite soldier from Ireland who served as colonel of Dillon's Regiment in the Irish Brigade in French service. He fought in the Nine Years' War and in the War of the Spanish Succession where he excelled at the Battle of Cremona against Prince Eugene of Savoy.

Birth and origins 

Arthur was born in 1670 in County Roscommon, Ireland, probably at Kilmore, his parents' habitual residence. He was the third son of Theobald Dillon and his wife Mary Talbot. His father was the 7th Viscount Dillon of Costello-Gallen and supported James II in the Williamite war in Ireland. His father's family was Old English and descended from Sir Henry Dillon, who came to Ireland with Prince John in 1185. 

Henry's mother was a daughter of Sir Henry Talbot of Templeogue and his wife Margaret Talbot, who was a sister of Richard Talbot, 1st Earl of Tyrconnell. The Talbots also were Old English.

Both his parents were Catholic. He was one of eight siblings, who are listed in his father's article. His elder brother Henry would succeed as the 8th Viscount Dillon.

Early life 
In 1688 his father raised two regiments for James II, one commanded by his son Henry, the other by his son Arthur, the subject of this article. In 1690 James II and Louis XIV agreed that an Irish Brigade of 5,400 men would be sent to France in exchange for six French regiments sent to Ireland with Lauzun. Arthur Dillon's Regiment was part of this Irish Brigade, which was led by Lord Mountcashel. Arthur, aged 20, landed with it at Brest on 1 May 1690.

Both his parents were killed in the Williamite war. His father fell at the Battle of Aughrim on 12 July 1691, whereas his mother was killed during the second Siege of Limerick by a shell fired into the town on 7 September 1691.

At that time France was in the middle of the Nine Years' War (1688–97) of which the Williamite War in Ireland had been a theatre. Dillon and his regiment were sent to Roussillon and Catalonia, another theatre of this same war, where they fought the Spanish, among others at the siege of Roses under the Duc de Noailles, in 1693. In 1695 the duc de Vendôme succeeded to Noailles. Vendôme besieged Barcelona, which was defended by its governor, the Conde de la Corzana, and by Prince George of Hesse-Darmstadt. The town surrendered on terms after a siege of 52 days on 10 August 1697.

Marriage and children 
The Nine Years' War ended in 1697 with the Treaty of Ryswick and four years of peace followed. Dillon found the time to marry. His chosen wife was Christina Sheldon, a maid-of-honour to Mary of Modena, queen consort of James II of England. Christina's parents were Ralph Sheldon of Ditchford, Worcestershire (1633–1723) and Elisabeth, heiress of Daniel Dunn of Garnish Hall in Essex. Dominic Sheldon, the Jacobite general, was her uncle. Her family was English and Catholic. She continued to serve Mary of Modena as lady-in-waiting at the Château de Saint-Germain-en-Laye.

 
Arthur and Christina had five sons:
 Charles (1701–1741), became the 10th Viscount Dillon
 Henry (1705–1787), became the 11th Viscount Dillon
 James (died 1745), became Colonel of Dillon's Regiment and fell in the Battle of Fontenoy
 Edward (1720–1747), succeeded his brother as Colonel of the Dillon Regiment and then fell in the Battle of Lauffeld
 Arthur Richard (1721–1806), became a French archbishop

—and five daughters:
 Frances, became a Carmelite nun
 Catharine (died 1753), became a Carmelite nun and died at St. Denis
 Mary (died 1786), died at St Germain
 Bridget (died 1785), married Baron Blaisel, a Lieutenant-General in the French Army
 Laura (died 1741), married Lucius Cary, 6th Viscount Falkland, a Jacobite

War of the Spanish Succession 

The War of the Spanish Succession (1701–1714) broke out after Charles II of Spain, the last Habsburg king of Spain, died without heir. Dillon and his regiment were first sent to the Rhine in 1701 where he served under François de Neufville, duc de Villeroy, but Villeroy and Dillon were soon transferred to northern Italy where France and its ally Savoy were trying to seize the Duchy of Milan, which belonged to Spain. French troops under the command of Marshal Nicolas Catinat fought the Austrians under Prince Eugene of Savoy. However, after Catinat lost the skirmish of Carpi on 9 July 1701, the command of the French troops in Italy was given to Villeroy under whom Catinat then served as second in command. On 1 September 1701 Prince Eugene defeated Villeroy at Chiari.

On 16 September 1701 James II died at Saint-Germain-en-Laye and was succeeded by James Francis Edward Stuart, James III for the Jacobites, the Old Pretender for the supporters of William III in England, who was succeeded by Queen Anne on 8 March 1702.''

Eugene's next move in northern Italy was to surprise Villeroy in his winter quarters in Cremona on the night of 31 January to 1 February 1702, an action also called the Battle of Cremona. Villeroy was taken prisoner, but the French were saved from defeat by Dillon's and Bourke's Irish regiments, who held the Po-gate and the bridge over the River Po against the Austrians, thus preventing Eugene from effecting his junction with the troops he had on the other side of the river. Eventually, Eugene could not hold the town against its garrison and had to retreat.

Villeroy was replaced with the duc de Vendôme, under whom Dillon had already served at Barcelona. Under Vendôme Dillon and his regiment fought in the battles of Santa-Vittoria on 26 July 1702, and Luzzara on 15 August 1702. On 1 October 1702 Dillon was promoted to brigadier. In 1703 Vendôme tried to effect a junction with the Bavarians, allied with the French against Austria, through the Tyrol and penetrated as far as Trent. Dillon took the town of Riva at the northern tip of Lake Garda. However, on 13 August 1704 Marlborough and Eugene beat the French and Bavarians at Blenheim. Savoy switched side and Vendôme had to retreat. In 1704 Dillon, aged 34, was promoted to maréchal de camp. On 16 August 1705 Vendôme repulsed Eugene at Cassano. Three Irish regiments, including Dillon's, played a key-role in halting Eugene's attack. Dillon was made a commander of the Order of Saint Louis.

On 23 May 1706 Marlborough beat Villeroy at Ramillies in the Spanish Netherlands. Thereupon, Louis XIV ordered Vendôme with a big part of the Armée d'Italie to Flanders to redress the situation there. Dillon and his regiment stayed behind in Northern Italy. Philippe II, Duke of Orléans, who would rule France as Regent from 1715 to 1723, replaced Vendôme in Italy, taking up his new position in July.

Together with Jacques Eléonor Rouxel de Grancey, comte de Médavy, Dillon defeated at the Battle of Castiglione on 9 September 1706 a Hessian unit under Prince Frederick of Hesse-Kassel that had arrived too late from Germany to join the main body of Eugene's army. Their victory had no effect, because the day before the French lost the decisive Battle of Turin (7 September 1706) and had to evacuate northern Italy.

On 24 September 1706 Dillon was promoted to lieutenant général for his action at Castiglione. Under Marshal Tessé Dillon and his regiment participated in the successful defence of Toulon in the Siege of Toulon (1707). In 1707 Austria signed the Convention of Milan ending the war in northern Italy.

in 1708 Dillon's regiment was transferred to the Moselle where Dillon served under Claude Louis Hector de Villars and James FitzJames, 1st Duke of Berwick.

In 1709 Berwick, and Dillon with him, were transferred to the Dauphiné to guard this French province against attacks from neighbouring Savoy. Dillon defended Briançon and on 28 August 1709 defeated , a Baltic German in Savoyard service, at the Pont de la Vachette. While in Grenoble Dillon had an affair with Claudine Guérin de Tencin who was at that time a nun at the convent of Montfleury at Corenc near Grenoble. She managed to leave her nunnery in 1712.

In 1711 Dillon was created comte Dillon in France by Louis XIV.
commander

In 1712, when the French opened peace talks with the English, James Francis Edward was told to leave France. He decided to take refuge in Lorraine (not yet part of France at that time). He left Saint-Germain-en-Laye on 6 September 1712 and arrived in Lorraine in February 1713 after a short stay in Châlons-sur-Marne.

The Peace of Utrecht on 11 April 1713 ended the war between France on one hand and Britain, the Netherlands, and Savoy on the other hand. In the treaty, France recognised the Hanoverian Succession and formally ended its support for the Jacobites.

However, the war between France and Austria continued. Comte Dillon, as he was now, was transferred from the Dauphiné to the Rhine for the campaign of 1713, where he served under Villars capturing Kaiserslautern on 24 June 1713 and the Castle Wolfstein. He then participated in the siege of Landau, 24 June to 26 August 1713, under Marshall Jacques Bazin de Bezons and in the siege of Freiburg, 20 September to 17 November 1713. The Treaty of Rastatt on 17 March 1714 ended the war with Austria.

However, the war still raged on in Spain where Catalonia tried to preserve Catalan autonomy by supporting Charles III against Philip V as Spanish King. Dillon was transferred to Spain under the command of Berwick where he returned to sit before Barcelona as he had done already in 1697. This Siege of Barcelona (1713-1714) was his last campaign. The town was stormed on 11 September 1714 and capitulated on the 12.

Later life 
Count Dillon was later appointed commander in the Dauphiné and governor of Toulon.

As a French General, Dillon was not allowed to participate in the Jacobite rising of 1715. Returning from Scotland following the failure of the rising, James Francis Edward found himself not welcome in Lorraine anymore and established himself at Avignon on 2 April 1716. On 1 February 1717 he appointed Dillon his plenipotentiary to the French court in Paris. In this role Dillon, together with Georg Heinrich von Görtz, and Carl Gyllenborg tried to convince Charles XII of Sweden to help the Jacobites to invade England. Dillon organised funds to support the project.

James remained concerned that Dillon as well as other Catholic supporters were not as tolerant of Protestant Jacobites as he wanted them to be. In 1718 Dillon was ordered to command a French contingent sent to Italy during the War of the Quadruple Alliance (1718–1720) and was replaced as agent in Paris initially by James Murray and then by Daniel O'Brien.

James Francis Edward, whom Dillon recognised as King James III, awarded him the Irish titles of Baron and Viscount on 1 February 1717 in Avignon. James III neglected to specify territorial designations for these titles, but he probably intended to appoint Arthur in place of his nephew Richard, who was in place in Ireland as the 9th Viscount Dillon of Costello-Gallen. In 1721 James III gave him Scottish titles by creating him Earl Dillon, also Viscount and Lord. In 1722 he was made a (Jacobite) Knight of the Thistle.

He was also a grandfather of the French generals Arthur Dillon and Théobald Dillon. He was a cousin of Gerard Lally. He was a great-grandfather of the famous memoirist Henriette-Lucy, Marquise de La Tour du Pin Gouvernet, née Henriette-Lucy Dillon.

In 1730 he retired from active service, handing over the command of the regiment to Charles, his eldest son.

Death, succession, and timeline 
On 5 February 1733 N.S., Arthur Dillon, comte de Dillon, died at the Château de Saint-Germain-en-Laye. His eldest son Charles, already colonel, now also succeeded to his father's titles: comte de Dillon in France and Earl of Dillon in the Jacobite peerage.

Notes and references

Notes

Citations

Sources 

 
 
 
  – Dacre to Dysart
  (For Dillon)
  – Scotland and Ireland (for Dillon)
  – (for timeline)
 
 
 
  – Coss to Exc
  – BER to BRA
  – COE to DOU
 
  – Viscounts (for Dillon)
 
 
 
 
  – 1694 to 1702
  – 1706 to 1708
 
  – 1704 to 1706
  – 1707 to 1710
  – 1711 to 1715
 
 

 
1670 births
1733 deaths
17th-century Irish people
18th-century Irish people
Earls in the Jacobite peerage
Irish Jacobites
Irish soldiers in the French Army
French generals
People from County Roscommon
Wild Geese (soldiers)
Younger sons of viscounts